Mahas District is a district in the central Hiran region of Somalia.

In 2023, an al-Shabaab double car bombing killed 35 people.

References
Maxaas, Hiiraan, Somalia

Districts of Somalia
Hiran, Somalia